Faïza Soulé Youssouf (born 1985) is a Comorian journalist and novelist. Her novel Ghizza, à tombeau ouvert was published in 2015.

Youssouf is a native of Moroni. She has served as the president of the Comorian branch of the Union de la presse francophone, and she is the editor-in-chief of Al-watwan. She has received awards for her writing as well.

References

1985 births
Living people
Comorian novelists
Comorian journalists
Comorian women writers
Women novelists
Comorian women journalists
21st-century novelists
21st-century women writers
People from Grande Comore
Comorian writers in French